Marcin Malinowski  (born 6 November 1975) is a Polish retired professional footballer who played as a midfielder. He currently serves as the assistant coach of Polish club Zagłębie Sosnowiec. From 1997 to 2015, he made 458 Ekstraklasa appearances for Odra Wodzisław and Ruch Chorzów, the 2nd highest amount of appearances in the league's history.

He began his career in Gwarek Zabrze, then moved  to Polonia Bytom. In 1997, he signed  a contract with Polish top division side Odra Wodzisław. The club won 3rd place in the league in 1997 and played in UEFA Europa League.

In 2002, for 2 years he moved to Ruch Chorzów. He returned to Odra Wodzisław in 2004 and played until the club was finally relegated to the I liga in 2010. Malinowski was appointed team captain from Wodzisław Śląski. For Odra he played 12 seasons, 303 matches and scored 12 goals in Ekstraklasa. In 2010, he moved to Ruch Chorzów.

External links
 

1975 births
Living people
Polish footballers
Gwarek Zabrze players
Polonia Bytom players
Odra Wodzisław Śląski players
Ruch Chorzów players
Ekstraklasa players
I liga players
III liga players
People from Wodzisław Śląski
Sportspeople from Silesian Voivodeship
Association football midfielders
Polish football managers